Ilsø is a Danish surname. Notable people with the surname include:

 Ken Ilsø (born 1986), Danish footballer
 Marco Ilsø (born 1994), Danish actor 
 Rasmus Ilsø, Danish bandmember of terminal
 , (born 1976) Danish association football player

Danish-language surnames